Tarache tetragona, the four-spotted bird dropping moth, is a moth of the family Noctuidae. It is found from southern Florida south through the Caribbean and from eastern Texas south through Mexico and most of Central America to Costa Rica.

The wingspan is about 20 mm.
The forewings have a white basal and medial area. The hindwings are white without a darker outer margin. Females are more darkly marked than males. Adults are on wing in February and September in North America.

The larvae feed on Malvaviscus arboreus and Herssantia crispa. The species overwinters as a pupa, made in an ovoid, sandy cocoon.

References

Moths described in 1858
Acontiinae
Moths of North America